Jack Harvey Keenan (June 8, 1919 – February 1977) was an American football guard in the National Football League for the Washington Redskins.  He played college football at the University of South Carolina.

References

1919 births
1977 deaths
American football offensive linemen
South Carolina Gamecocks football players
Washington Redskins players
Players of American football from Greensboro, North Carolina